Rita Pfister (born 20 March 1952) is a Swiss athlete. She competed in the women's discus throw at the 1976 Summer Olympics.

References

1952 births
Living people
Athletes (track and field) at the 1976 Summer Olympics
Swiss female discus throwers
Olympic athletes of Switzerland
Place of birth missing (living people)